Myelin-associated glycoprotein (MAG, Siglec-4) is a type 1 transmembrane protein glycoprotein localized in periaxonal Schwann cell and oligodendrocyte membranes, where it plays a role in glial-axonal interactions. MAG is a member of the SIGLEC family of proteins and is a functional ligand of the NOGO-66 receptor,  NgR. MAG is believed to be involved in myelination during nerve regeneration in the  PNS and is vital for the long-term survival of the myelinated axons following myelinogenesis. In the  CNS MAG is one of three main myelin-associated inhibitors of axonal regeneration after injury, making it an important protein for future research on neurogenesis in the CNS.

Structure 
MAG is a 100 kDA glycoprotein. Uncleaved MAG is a complete transmembrane form, which acts as a signaling and adhesion molecule. MAG can also act as a signaling molecule as a soluble protein after it has been proteolytically shed. This form of the protein is called dMAG.

Adhesion 
MAG has an extended conformation of five  immunoglobulin (Ig) domains and a homodimeric arrangement involving membrane-proximal domains Ig4 and Ig5. MAG-oligosaccharide complex structures and biophysical assays show how MAG engages axonal gangliosides at domain Ig1.

Function

Myelin-axon interactions 
MAG is a critical protein in the formation and maintenance of myelin sheaths. MAG is localized on the inner membrane of the myelin sheath and interacts with axonal membrane proteins to attach the myelin sheath to the axon..\ Mutations to the MAG gene are implicated in demyelination diseases such as multiple sclerosis.

Inhibition of nerve regeneration 
Axons in the central nervous system do not regenerate after injury the same way that axons in the peripheral nervous system do.  The mechanism responsible for inhibited neuroregeneration is regulated by three main proteins, one of which is MAG.  The exact mechanism through which MAG inhibits neuroregeneration appears to be through binding of  NgR. This receptor is also bound by  Nogo protein, suggesting that the mechanism of myelin-associated inhibition of axon regeneration through  NgR the has redundant ligands, furthering the inhibition. MAG binds with high affinity to NgR, suggesting that it is equally as responsible for inhibition of axon regeneration as Nogo.

Rho kinase pathway 
Once MAG (or Nogo) has bound to NgR, NgR activates the  rho kinase (ROCK) pathway. The activation of the rho kinase pathway leads to the phosphorylation of proteins which inhibit neurite outgrowth.

See also 
Myelin
Myelinogenesis
 NgR
Myelin oligodendrocyte glycoprotein
Anti-MAG peripheral neuropathy

External links

References 

Lectins
SIGLEC